Ian Bagg is a Canadian comedian, actor, and writer. He is known for bantering with audience members. He was a finalist on the ninth season of Last Comic Standing in 2015. Bagg has been a regular on Jimmy Kimmel's Comedy Club show in Las Vegas until it closed temporarily due to the COVID-19 pandemic. He has also appeared on other shows.

Early life 
Bagg is a native of Terrace, British Columbia. He moved to New York City in 1996. Bagg previously lived in Washougal, Washington, where he often performed at the local Grand Theatre.

Career 
Bagg has performed on The Tonight Show, The Late Late Show and in films Cradle Will Rock, MXP 2 and MXP 3. He featured in specials on Comedy Central, HBO and Showtime.

Bagg was interviewed on WGN in 2017 and in 2019.

He appeared on Tom Segura and Christina Pazsitzky’s podcast Your Mom's House" in September 2020 and June 2021

In July 2021 Ian Bagg began co-hosting (with Matt Fondiler) the Sword and Scale Rewind Podcast, a comedy aftershow for the popular true-crime podcast Sword and Scale.

Personal life 
Bagg lives in Long Beach, California.

Filmography

Film

Television

Discography 
2012- It Takes A Village
2018- Conversations
2020- Everybody Wants Some

References

External links
 

Year of birth missing (living people)
Living people
People from Terrace, British Columbia
Canadian expatriates in the United States
21st-century Canadian comedians
20th-century Canadian comedians
Canadian male comedians